The Military ranks of Paraguay are the military insignia used by the Armed Forces of Paraguay.

Current ranks

Commissioned officer ranks
The rank insignia of commissioned officers.

Other ranks
The rank insignia of non-commissioned officers and enlisted personnel.

Historical ranks

Historically, until the fall of the Stroessner regime, Paraguayan insignia were based on the Prussian system, as was the case for many other South American countries, only with slight distinctions.

Two individuals held the rank of Field Marshal of the Paraguayan Armies, the highest distinction in the nation. They were Francisco Solano López (during his own lifetime) and José Félix Estigarribia (awarded after his death). However, the rank itself is just a ceremonial honour and does not officially belong to the ranks of the Paraguayan Army.

Both Francisco Solano López and José Félix Estigarribia had the "official" rank of General of the Army (General de Ejército).

1954 – 1989
Officers

Enlisted

References

External links
 

Paraguay
Military of Paraguay